Wasteland is the second studio album by American R&B singer Brent Faiyaz. It was released on July 8, 2022, by Lost Kids, Venice Music and Stem Disintermedia. It was executive produced by Jonathan "Freeze" Wells. The production on the album was handled multiple producers including Jake One, DJ Dahi, The Neptunes and No I.D. among others. The album also features guest appearances by Drake, Tyler, the Creator, Alicia Keys, and more.

Wasteland was supported by four singles: "Dead Man Walking", "Gravity", "Wasting Time" and "Price of Fame". The album received generally positive reviews from music critics and was a commercial success. It debuted at number two on the US Billboard 200 chart, earning 88,000 album-equivalent units in its first week.

Background and recording 
The album was proceeded by the singles "Dead Man Walking", released September 20, 2020; "Gravity", released January 29, 2021; "Wasting Time", released July 1, 2021; and "Price of Fame" as well as its accompanying music video, both released June 24, 2022. A music video for "Loose Change" released September 9, 2022, featuring Faiyaz watching a ballet adaptation of the album. The video, shot in black-and-white, also features American Olympic gymnast Nastasya Generalova as another audience member, and was directed by Lone Wolf and Mark Peaced.

In an interview with Rolling Stone, Faiyaz was asked about where he likes to create and he explained that he recorded Wasteland "in every city. I did some of it in New York, some of it in Atlanta. Some of it in Los Angeles, some of it in the Bahamas." For Vogue, Faiyaz called the making of the album "less of an album process and more of a life process" where he "made a collection of songs and tied a story line together once I saw that they all kind of shared a similar theme" and "didn't really realize I was working on an album until I was maybe a little over halfway through." Asked to name his inspirations for the album, he said "I was watching a lot of Tarantino films. I was watching Jackie Brown over and over again. I was also watching Vanilla Sky on repeat. I pulled a lot from that. But mostly I was inspired by the different people that I locked in with, from The Dream  to Alicia Keys. I was just soaking up game from artists like Raphael Saadiq and No I.D., who have been doing this longer than I have."

Style 
Per Stereogums Tom Breihan, the album's "clear focal point is Faiyaz, who sings so beautifully about ugly situations", with interlude sketches which Breihan compares to Kendrick Lamar's "We Cry Together", saying that they contain "Faiyaz and his baby's mother argu[ing] about their relationship, and things get[ting] intense enough to put all of the album's seduction-talk into a bracing and self-destructive new context." Complexs Joe Price called the album "an expansive effort that sees Faiyaz at his most confident" where "atop nocturnal, sparse production, he flaunts his smooth vocals and penchant for effortless hooks" and even "finds time to experiment, including on "Ghetto Gatsby", which features almost no percussion."

Critical reception 

Clashs Robin Murray wrote that Wasteland "has been some five years in the making, and its arrival feels like a genuine event", noting a "palpable excitement online" with Faiyaz "trending globally for hours", but "the album doesn't quite feel like it meets the hype." Given the length of time leading up to the release, "some of the blockbuster highlights – the epic Tyler[, the Creator] feature, for example – have been online for some time now, dulling the unified impact." The album "contains some imperious highs" such as "Loose Change" which is "truly beautiful, the arrangement somehow both gloriously languid and ultra-minimalist", but the album suffers for a "streaming-friendly 19 tracks" which "could bare a little trimming" as well as "some songs that don't land" like "inessential" "Bad Luck" and "Addictions" which "takes the toxicity banner a little too far." The Guardians Tara Joshi wrote that "Although Faiyaz already has a dedicated fanbase, this assured, sensual and ambitious record looks likely to bring him to an ever-wider audience."

Dani Blum of Pitchfork felt that Faiyaz's "lovely vocals and intriguing ideas" are lost "underneath blockbuster features and irritating interludes." The album is "cinematic in the most clunkily literal sense", with three skits and a "two-and-half-minute-long ramble" of an introduction which "culminates in an intriguing, if not obvious question: 'What purpose do your vices serve in your life?'", a question to which Faiyaz "spends the next hour dodging the answer." Compared to "clear influence[s]" Drake and The Weeknd, who both "ground [their] aching melodrama in tangible grit, sculpting scenes out of specifics", Faiyaz "mainly opts for sweeping statements about how evil he is, a rigid moral clarity that sometimes comes across as laziness" with any detail only acting to "further fuel the caricature."

Year-end lists

Commercial performance
Wasteland debuted at number two on the US Billboard 200 chart, earning 88,000 album-equivalent units (including 6,000 copies in pure album sales) in its first week. This became Brent Faiyaz's first US top-ten debut on the chart. The album also accumulated a total of 107.48 million on-demand official streams from the set's tracks. In its second week, the album dropped to number nine on the chart, earning an additional 32,000 units. On November 30, 2022, the album was certified gold by the Recording Industry Association of America (RIAA) for combined sales and album-equivalent units of over 500,000 units in the United States.

Track listing

Charts

Weekly charts

Year-end charts

Certifications

References 

2022 albums
Brent Faiyaz albums
albums produced by Jake One
Contemporary R&B albums by American artists